Map of places in South Ayrshire compiled from this list

This List of places in South Ayrshire is a list of links for any town, village, castle, golf course, historic house, lighthouse, nature reserve, reservoir, river and other place of interest in the South Ayrshire council area of Scotland.

A
Ailsa Craig
Alloway, Burns Cottage, Burns National Heritage Park
Auchensoul
Ayr, Ayr railway station, Belmont, Doonfoot, Somerset Park

B
Balkissock
Ballantrae, Ballantrae railway station
Barassie, Barassie railway station 
Bargany Gardens
Barr
Barrhill
Belston
Blairquhan

C
Carrick, Carrick Forest
Cloyntie 
Colmonell
Coodham
Crosshill
Crossraguel, Crossraguel Abbey
Culroy
Culzean, Culzean Castle
Currarie

D
Dailly
Danure
Dipple
Doonholm
Dowhill
Drumshang
Dundonald, Dundonald Castle
Dunure, Dunure Castle, Dunure railway station

E
Electric Brae

F
Failford
Fisherton

G
Girvan, Girvan and Portpatrick Junction Railway
Glasgow Prestwick Airport, Glasgow Prestwick Airport railway station
Grimmet

H
Heads of Ayr, Heads of Ayr Holiday Camp railway station
Hersonford

K
Kirkmichael
Kirkoswald, Kirkoswald Parish Church
Knokdolian
Knoweside

L
Ladybank
Lendalfoot

M
Maidens, Maidens and Dunure Light Railway
Mainholm
Maxwelton, Maxwelton Braes
Maybole, Maybole and Girvan Railway, Maybole railway station, Maybole Castle
Merkland
Minishant
Monkton
Mossblown
Muirhead

N
Newark
New Prestwick

O
Old Dailly

P
Penkill
Pinmore
Pinwherry
Prestwick, Prestwick Golf Club, Prestwick Town railway station

R
Rosemount

S
Saint Quivox
Souter Johnnie's Cottage
Straiton
Suachrie
Sawny Bean's Cave

T
Tarbolton, Tarbolton railway station 
Tormitchell
Troon, Troon railway station, Troon (old) railway station, Troon (Harbour) railway station
Turnberry, Turnberry Castle, Turnberry Golf Course, Turnberry lighthouse, Turnberry railway station

W
Water of Girvan

See also
List of places in Scotland

Lists of places in Scotland
Populated places in Scotland